Pachnephorus bryanti is a species of leaf beetle found in Mali, described by Stefano Zoia in 2007. It is named after the British entomologist Gilbert Ernest Bryant.

References

Eumolpinae
Beetles of Africa
Insects of West Africa
Beetles described in 2007